George Musgrave may refer to:

George Musgrave (bush tracker), Australian bush tracker
George Musgrave (MP), MP for Carlisle
Sir George Musgrave, 10th Baronet, High Sheriff of Cumberland, of the Musgrave baronets
George Musgrave (academic)